This is a list of diplomatic missions of Turkmenistan, excluding honorary consulates. The country has established diplomatic relations with 151 states.

The country currently maintains 40 representative offices in 30 different countries and territories.

Americas

 Washington, D.C. (Embassy)

Asia

 Kabul (Embassy)
 Mazar-i-Sharif (Consulate)
 Herat (Consulate)

Yerevan (Embassy)

Baku (Embassy)

 Beijing (Embassy)
 
 Tbilisi (Embassy)

 New Delhi (Embassy)

 Tehran (Embassy)
 Mashhad (Consulate-General)

 Tokyo (Embassy)

 Astana (Embassy)
 Aktau (Consulate)
 Almaty (Consular section)
 
 Bishkek (Embassy)

 Kuala Lumpur (Embassy)

 Islamabad (Embassy)

 Riyadh (Embassy)
 
 Seoul (Embassy) 

 Dushanbe (Embassy)

 Ankara (Embassy)
 Istanbul (Consulate-General)

 Abu Dhabi (Embassy)
 Dubai (Consulate-General)

 Tashkent (Embassy)

Europe

Vienna (Embassy)

Minsk (Embassy)

Brussels (Embassy)

Paris (Embassy)

Berlin (Embassy)
Frankfurt (Consulate)

 Rome (Embassy)

 Bucharest (Embassy)

Moscow (Embassy)
Astrakhan (Consulate)
Kazan (Consulate-General)

Geneva (Embassy)

Kyiv (Embassy)
 Kharkov (consular section)

London (Embassy)

Embassies to open

Tel Aviv (Embassy)

Doha (Embassy)

Multilateral Organizations
 Brussels (Permanent Mission to the European Union)
 Geneva (Permanent Mission to the United Nations Office at Geneva)
 Minsk (Permanent Mission to the Commonwealth of Independent States)
 New York (Permanent Mission to the United Nations)
 Paris (Permanent Mission to UNESCO)
 Vienna (Permanent Mission to the United Nations Office at Vienna)
 Vienna (Permanent Mission to the International Atomic Energy Agency)

Gallery

Accredited missions abroad 

  (Ankara)
 
 
 
 
 
 
 
 
 
 
 
 
 
 
 
 
 
 
 
 
 
 
 
 
 
 
 
 
 
 
 
 
 
 
 
 
 
 
 
 
 
 
 
 
 
 
  
 
 
 
 
 
 
 
 
 
 
 
 
 
 
 
 
 
 
 
 
 
 
 
  (Nur-Sultan)

References

External links
 DIPLOMATIC MISSIONS AND CONSULAR OFFICES OF TURKMENISTAN ABROAD
 Diplomatic missions of Turkmenistan

 
Turkmenistan
Diplomatic missions